The Auckland Park Academy of Excellence is a Muslim school situated in Auckland Park, Johannesburg, South Africa. The school was established at the beginning of the academic year in 2011. The school's secular curriculum is based on the National Curriculum as stipulated by the Department of Education of the Republic of South Africa. APAX also offers its learners an Islamic curriculum.

Phases 
As of 2017, the Auckland Park Academy of Excellence comprises grades 1 to 12. These are known as the Foundation, Intermediate  and FET(Further Education and Training) Phases. Having started off with grades 1 to 6 in 2011, the school has added an additional grade each academic year until 2017.

References

External links 
Gauteng Department of Education
Auckland Park Academy of Excellence official site

Islamic schools in South Africa
Private schools in Gauteng
Educational institutions established in 2011
2011 establishments in South Africa